Junior Fabio Fernández (born March 2, 1997) is a Dominican professional baseball pitcher in the Toronto Blue Jays organization. He has previously played in Major League Baseball (MLB) for the St. Louis Cardinals and Pittsburgh Pirates.

Career

St. Louis Cardinals
Fernández signed with the St. Louis Cardinals as an international free agent in July 2014. 

Fernández made his professional debut that year with the Dominican Summer League Cardinals, posting an 0-5 record and a 5.79 ERA over seven games (six starts). He spent 2015 with the Gulf Coast Cardinals, going 3-2 with a 3.88 ERA in 11 games (nine starts) and also appeared in two games with the Palm Beach Cardinals, giving up one run over  innings. Fernández started 2016 with the Peoria Chiefs and was promoted to the Palm Beach Cardinals in July. He finished the 2016 season with a combined 8-7 record and 4.06 ERA in 24 games (20 starts) between both clubs. 

Fernández returned to Palm Beach for the 2017 season where he was named a Florida State League All-Star, posting a 5-3 record with a 3.69 ERA over 16 starts. He began 2018 back with Palm Beach and was promoted to the Springfield Cardinals during the season. He missed over two months of the season due to injury, and was placed on the disabled list twice. Over 24 relief appearances between the two teams, he went 1-0 with a 3.52 ERA.

Fernández began the 2019 season with Palm Beach. He was promoted to Springfield in May, and he earned another promotion to the Triple-A Memphis Redbirds in June. In the more than 65 innings he pitched between the three teams for the season, he went 3-2 with a 1.52 ERA, striking out eighty.

On August 6, 2019, the Cardinals selected Fernández's contract and promoted him to the major leagues. Over 13 relief appearances with St. Louis, he pitched to a 5.40 ERA.

Fernández began the 2020 season with St. Louis On August 4, 2020, it was announced that he had tested positive for COVID-19, and was subsequently placed on the injured list. He pitched a total of three innings during the season.

On September 5, 2022, Fernández was designated for assignment.

Pittsburgh Pirates
On September 7, he was claimed off waivers by the Pittsburgh Pirates. On November 15, Fernández was designated for assignment.

Toronto Blue Jays
On November 18, 2022, Fernández was claimed off waivers by the New York Yankees. He was designated for assignment on December 21, 2022. 

Fernández was claimed off waivers by the Toronto Blue Jays on January 5, 2023, On January 10, Fernández designated for assignment by the Blue Jays following the acquisition of Zach Thompson. On January 17, Fernández cleared waivers and was sent outright to the Triple-A Buffalo Bisons.

References

External links

1997 births
Living people
Sportspeople from Santo Domingo
Dominican Republic expatriate baseball players in the United States
Major League Baseball players from the Dominican Republic
Major League Baseball pitchers
St. Louis Cardinals players
Pittsburgh Pirates players
Dominican Summer League Cardinals players
Gulf Coast Cardinals players
Peoria Chiefs players
Palm Beach Cardinals players
Springfield Cardinals players
Memphis Redbirds players
Águilas Cibaeñas players
Indianapolis Indians players